Jonathan Ricketts (born November 20, 1997) is an American professional soccer player who currently plays for Rio Grande Valley FC in the USL Championship.

Career

College and amateur
Ricketts played four years of college soccer at Bryan College between 2016 and 2019. During his time with the Lions, Ricketts made 70 appearances, scoring 33 goals and tallying 28 assists. In his junior season, Ricketts collected a spot on the Appalachian Athletic Conference (AAC) All-Conference First Team. In his last season at Bryan College, Ricketts repeated on the AAC All-Conference First Team, earned a spot on the All-Tournament Team, and found himself on CoSIDA's Academic All-District Team. During his time at college, Ricketts appeared for NPSL side Chattanooga FC in 2018, and with USL League Two side Dalton Red Wolves in 2019. For the Dalton Red Wolves, Ricketts scored 3 goals and tallied 3 assists  in the 2019 season and earned himself a spot on the USL League 2 All-Southern Conference Team of the Year.

Professional
Ricketts signed his first professional contract in December 2019, joining USL League One side Chattanooga Red Wolves ahead of their 2020 season. He made his debut on July 25, 2020, starting in a 2–2 draw with South Georgia Tormenta. In his rookie season, he logged 1,212 minutes, earned 14 starts, connected 28.5 passes per match, won 43 aerial duels (73.8 percent of total aerial duals), won 129 duals (72.8 percent of total duels), and won 19 tackles (70.4 percent  of total tackles). Ricketts landed on the USL League One Team of the Week once during his rookie campaign.

Chattanooga Red Wolves SC took Ricketts' option for the 2021 season. In his second season with the club, Ricketts made 29 appearances and logged starts in all 29 of those matches, compiling 2,644 minutes for the Red Wolves in their 2021 campaign. Ricketts scored four goals and assisted four times from the right back position. He had a 73.4 percent pass-completion percentage, 60 clearances, 6 blocks, and 52 interceptions on the season. Ricketts landed on USL League One's Team of the Week five times during the 2021 Season.

Ricketts made the move to USL Championship side Rio Grande Valley FC on February 23, 2022.

References

External links
 
 

1997 births
Living people
American soccer players
Association football forwards
Chattanooga FC players
Chattanooga Red Wolves SC players
Soccer players from Tennessee
National Premier Soccer League players
USL League One players
USL League Two players
Sportspeople from Chattanooga, Tennessee
Bryan Lions men's soccer players
Rio Grande Valley FC Toros players